The Best of Rufus Wainwright is a concert tour by American-Canadian singer-songwriter Rufus Wainwright, in support of his greatest hits album, Vibrate: The Best of Rufus Wainwright (2014). The tour was announced on Wainwright's official website in December 2013, initially for 23 performances in more than 20 countries throughout Europe during March–April 2014. Subsequent dates were added in France, the United States and the United Kingdom, extending the number of concerts to 31. Wainwright's half-sister, Lucy Wainwright Roche, was the opening act for select dates.

Development

On December 11, 2013, Wainwright's official website announced a 23-date "greatest hits" tour throughout Europe, during which Wainwright will perform in twenty countries in the months of March and April 2014. The tour, called "The Best of Rufus Wainwright", began on March 4 at Vicar Street in Dublin, Ireland. The second show, to be held the following day, took place at Usher Hall in Edinburgh, Scotland and was part of a commemoration of the musical heritage and history of the 100-year-old venue. Wainwright's performance at the Palladium in Riga will be his first in Latvia. His Zagreb concert will mark his second in Croatia.

On December 20, Wainwright's website announced that the tour would be extended to include two shows in France (April 23 and 25). On January 13, 2014, four additional concerts in the United States were announced in support of the album, extending the tour to 29 shows. Wainwright will perform in New York, Washington, D.C., Los Angeles and San Francisco, before returning to France and the United Kingdom. Due to popular demand, a second show was added at San Francisco's Palace of Fine Arts. On January 20, an additional performance was added in Coventry, United Kingdom, extending the tour to April 27.

Wainwright's half-sister, Lucy Wainwright Roche, was the opening act in Riga, Prague, Berlin, and Coventry.

Tour dates

References

2014 concert tours
Rufus Wainwright